Ashland University is a private Christian university in Ashland, Ohio. The university consists of a  main campus and several off-campus centers throughout central and northern Ohio. Ashland was founded in 1878 as Ashland College.  It is affiliated with The Brethren Church.

In addition to a graduate school, the university consists of four colleges: the College of Arts and Sciences, the Schar College of Education, the Dauch College of Business and Economics, and the Schar College of Nursing and Health Sciences. Ashland Theological Seminary, a division of Ashland University, offers a Doctor of Ministry (D.Min.) degree as well as a number of master's degrees. Ashland is classified as a master's university with most graduate research being in a professional field.

History

On May 28, 1877, a town meeting was held in Ashland, Ohio, where the citizens were to consider a proposal from members of the German Baptist Brethren Church to establish an institution of higher education. The Ashland Press reported that the citizens were promised the college would locate there if their city would raise $10,000. The church and community fundraising campaign proved to be a success and on Feb 17, 1878, a meeting was held to add up their campaign funds and make final plans. The success of the campaign was announced, the college was chartered on February 20 and a church-related, co-educational institution was established.

In April 1878, the board of trustees decided to purchase the "most desirable plot in town – 28 acres on the hill." The first buildings to be constructed were Founders Hall and Allen Hall, constructed from bricks made on the site. Classes opened at Ashland College on Sep 17, 1879, with somewhere around 60 students and eight faculty members.

The new institution grew slowly during its first few decades, but enrollment reached the 200 mark shortly after the turn of the century. By the 1950s, the college had added many new programs of study and experienced rapid growth from about 300 students to more than 2,500 in 1970.

By 1972, Ashland faced a financial crisis as a result of a decline in enrollment and stagnating economy. But shortly after this, several new programs, including a master of education and master of business administration, were created and a number of off-campus centers were developed.

In 1989, college officials decided to change the name of the institution to Ashland University. This change to university status reflected more accurately what the institution had become, with total student enrollment around the 5,600 mark and almost evenly divided between graduate and undergraduate students.

Progress has continued on campus since the 1980s with the construction of several new academic buildings, a new Recreation Center, Student Center and Athletic Complex and the Jack W. Liebert Military and Veterans Center. In addition, in 2010, the university acquired MedCentral Health System's College of Nursing in Mansfield and began a campaign to raise money to construct the  Dwight Schar College of Nursing and Health Sciences in Mansfield. The building opened for classes on June 20, 2014.

Academics

College of Arts and Sciences
The academic programs of the College of Arts and Sciences are housed in seven buildings across the campus. The Kettering Science Center, home to the Departments of Biology/Toxicology and Chemistry/Geology/Physics, was renovated and expanded in 2006 and includes laboratories and specialized equipment rooms for teaching and research in biological, computer, and physical sciences as well as a  greenhouse. The Center for the Arts includes the Hugo Young Theatre, studio theatre, Don Coburn Art Gallery, studios for WRDL-FM and TV-20, the Elizabeth Pastor Recital Hall, and is home to the Departments of Art, Music, Theatre and Communication Arts. The Center for the Humanities in Bixler Hall houses the Departments of English, Philosophy, Foreign Languages, the Writing Studio, and the Ashland Center for Nonviolence. The Department of Religion is in the Rinehart Center for Religious Studies. Patterson Technology Center houses the Department of Mathematics and Computer Science as well as the Office of Information Technology. Andrews Hall is home to the Department of History/Political Science. Criminal Justice/Sociology, Social Work and Psychology are located within the Dwight Schar College of Education.

WRDL (88.9 FM) is an educational radio station broadcasting a Top 40 format. Licensed to Ashland, Ohio, USA, the station serves the North-Central Ohio area. The station is owned and operated by Ashland University.

Dauch College of Business and Economics

The Richard E. and Sandra J. Dauch College of Business and Economics building, which includes the Burton D. Morgan Center for Entrepreneurial Studies wing, opened for classes in January 2004. This  building serves as the home for business administration, supply chain management, economics and MBA programs and features a trading room with Wall Street-style workstations and wall-mounted displays with market news for Ashland University's Eagle Investment Group, an executive education center, computer labs, tiered lecture hall and product development lab.

Dwight Schar College of Education
The two-story,  Dwight Schar College of Education building opened in March 2006 and is home to the undergraduate teacher education program as well as the master of education program and doctor of education program. The building features 12 classrooms, four seminar rooms, 60 faculty and staff offices, several commons or meeting areas, a media center, peer teaching studio with one-way viewing mirror and 165-seat lecture hall. The building's two-way interactive distance learning capability allows the college to do live broadcasts from several locations inside the facility.

Ashland's education program is accredited by the National Council for Accreditation of Teacher Education (NCATE) at the basic and advanced levels. Approval to offer the Master of Education degree was granted by the Ohio Board of Regents in 1975. Approval for offering certification for the Master of Education degree was granted by the Ohio Department of Education in 1976. Additionally, licensure and endorsement programs are approved by the Ohio Department of Education.

Dwight Schar College of Nursing & Health Sciences
The Ashland University College of Nursing evolved from a hospital-based diploma program that was established in 1919 by the Mansfield General Hospital.

Founded in 1997 under MedCentral and acquired by Ashland University in 2010, the College of Nursing is a private institution of higher education offering programs of study leading to the baccalaureate degree in nursing. Together, the rich tradition of the School of Nursing and now the College of Nursing has served the communities of North Central Ohio for more than 85 years. The College of Nursing currently boasts more than 1,500 nursing alumni who are leaders in their profession.

Ashland University completed a $15.5 million campaign – "Compassion, Community, Commitment ... Building a Healthy Tomorrow" – to build a 46,000-square-foot academic building for the new Dwight Schar College of Nursing and Health Science in Mansfield. The campaign received a $5 million lead gift from Ashland University alumnus and longtime supporter Dwight Schar.

Groundbreaking for the Dwight Schar College of Nursing took place on June 16, 2011. The new facility includes a number of clinical laboratories housed within the Simulation Center, including a Health Foundations lab, Family Health lab, Adult Health lab, Complex Health lab, ICU/CCU/NICU, Advanced Care lab, Community Health Home Care lab, and four patient examination labs. Other spaces in the building include traditional classrooms, faculty/staff offices, student study and lounge areas, and student support spaces.

The building opened for fall nursing classes on August 20, 2012, and a dedication and ribbon cutting ceremony took place on October 12, 2012. Ashland University nursing students complete their first two years of the program on the Ashland University campus in Ashland and then move to the Mansfield campus for the last two years of education and clinical studies. Growth of the program has included a Doctor of Nursing Practice degree and a Physician's Assistant program.

College of Adult Studies
Created in 2010, the College of Adult Studies offers the following programs and services: Professional Development Services, Telego Center for Educational Improvement, Division of Adult Studies, Gill Center for Business and Economic Education, PSEOP/Dual Credit, Continuing Education Certificate Training and Veteran Services.

Accreditation
Ashland University is accredited by the Higher Learning Commission and is authorized by the Ohio Board of Regents to grant bachelor's, master's and doctoral degree. Individual programs are accredited by the Commission on Accreditation of Athletic Training Education, the Association of Collegiate Business Schools and Programs, the National Council for Accreditation of Teacher Education, the National Association of Schools of Music, the American Association of Theological Schools, the Commission on Collegiate Nursing Education, the Council on Social Work Education, the American Chemical Society, the Accreditation Commission for Programs in Hospitality Administration and the Commission on Accreditation of Allied Health Education Programs.

Rankings
In 2019 Ashland University was ranked #495 in Top Colleges 2019 by Forbes.

U.S. News & World Report ranked Ashland University in the Top 200 National University institutions in the 2016 edition of its America's Best Colleges survey. In 2021 Ashland University was ranked #51 in Regional Universities Midwest  by U.S. News & World Report.

Ashland University was named as one of the top 15 over-performing colleges in the nation by U.S. News & World Report in December 2012. The publication looked at data from its Best Colleges 2013, then took peer assessments and compared the information to the actual rankings. Ashland University's performance is 58 places above its peer assessments, placing it among the top 15 over-performing schools in the country.

Student Life
The university enrolls 7,965 students, 80 percent of whom are undergraduate students. Seventy-nine percent of graduates are employed or pursuing further education six months after graduation. Ninety-nine percent of first-time, full-time freshmen receive some kind of financial aid.

Greek organizations

Fraternities
Phi Delta Theta
Phi Kappa Psi
Kappa Sigma

Sororities
Alpha Delta Pi
Delta Zeta
Alpha Phi
Theta Phi Alpha

Faculty 
There are nearly full-time 200 faculty, and 80% hold the highest degree in their field. The student to faculty ratio is 13:1.

Emeritus faculty

 Lucille Ford - Nationally known economist, inducted in the Ohio Foundation of Independent Colleges' (OFIC) Hall of Excellence,
 Jane Piirto - Lifetime Achievement Award Winner, Mensa 2007, Higher Education Award from the Ohio Association of Gifted Children 2007, International Creativity Award from the World Council for Gifted and Talented Children 2017

Notable faculty 

 Amy Klinger - "Nationally recognized as an expert in school safety and crisis management."

Athletics

Ashland University participates in NCAA Division II for athletics. Ashland's athletic teams are known as the Eagles, and the colors are purple and gold. Ashland participates in the Great Midwest Athletic Conference (G-MAC) since the 2021–22 academic year. They formerly had competed in the Great Lakes Intercollegiate Athletic Conference (GLIAC) from 1995–96 to 2020–21; and before that they were a charter member of the American Mideast Conference of the National Association of Intercollegiate Athletics (NAIA) on three different tenures.

Ashland offers athletic scholarships in 11 men's, 12 women's and one co-ed sport – with the men competing in baseball, basketball, cross country, football, golf, indoor and outdoor track, soccer, swimming, tennis and wrestling, and the women competing in basketball, cross country, golf, indoor and outdoor track, lacrosse, soccer, softball, swimming, tennis, volleyball and STUNT. Esports, a co-ed sport, was added in 2018. The university's $23 million athletic complex features a 5,200-seat football stadium, a 1,000-seat stadium for track & field and soccer, and a state-of-the-art training facility. The Niss Athletic Center, which broke ground in 2020, will feature an 80-yard turf field, a 300-meter six-lane track and an eight-lane sprint track, as well as field jump and throwing areas and batting cages.

Ashland students have won more than 650 All-America honors, 56 national championships and one Sullivan Award. With more than 800 student athletes, Eagle athletics has consistently been ranked in the Top 10 of the Learfield Sports Directors' Cup standings and was the top ranked Division II athletic program in the country in 2015.

Centers
Ashland Theological Seminary (ATS), a graduate division of Ashland University, is an evangelical seminary located in Ashland, Ohio, with extension campuses in Cleveland, Columbus and Detroit.
Ashbrook Center for Public Affairs is an academic center at Ashland University, dedicated by Ronald Reagan on May 9, 1983. One emphasis of the center is promoting the study of American history, government, politics, and constitutional interpretation for young people, teachers, and scholars. The Ashbrook Center was established and named in honor of the late Congressman John M. Ashbrook (1928–1982) who represented Ohio's 17th Congressional district for 21 years. Ashbrook was an American politician of the Republican Party who served in the United States House of Representatives from Ohio from 1961 until his death.

Alumni

Academia 
Benjamin Bolger – perpetual student who has earned 14 degrees
Robert Clouse (professor) – professor
J. Garber Drushal – eighth President of The College of Wooster
Detrick Hughes 2011 – author/poet
Charles H. Kraft – American anthropologist, linguist, evangelical Christian speaker, and Professor
Peter Linneman 1973 – Albert Sussman Professor of Real Estate, Finance and Public Policy, Wharton School of Business
Bruce McLarty (received doctorate) – president of Harding University
Clara Worst Miller – academic and writer

Business 
Daniel Bogden – American attorney
Koo Bon-moo –  business executive of the LG Group
Madalyn Murray O'Hair – founder of American Atheists
Dwight Schar 1964 – chairman, President and CEO Northern Virginia/Ryan Homes

Entertainment 
Dwier Brown 1980 – actor; Field of Dreams, The Thorn Birds
Xiong Ru-Lin – Chinese singer
Amy Stoch – American actress

Statistics 
Jill DeMatteis –  Pat Doyle Award winner

Sports 
Art Warren– American professional baseball pitcher
Trevor Bassitt - Bronze metal winner at the 2022 World Championships in the 400m hurdles
Gil Dodds 1941 – set the American record for the mile in 1942 and in 1943 was honored with the Sullivan Award
Bayard Elfvin 2003 – US National soccer team goalkeeper
Madman Fulton – American professional wrestler
Judy Hahn – head coach of women's volleyball at Malone College
Carlin Isles 2012 (attended two years) – United States National Rugby Sevens Team
Jackie Jeschelnig – American hammer thrower
Kibwé Johnson – American Olympic track and field athlete 
Ruth Jones – head women's basketball coach for Purdue University
Jamie Meder 2014 – American football player
Katie Nageotte - 2020 Summer Olympics the gold medal winner
Ray Novotny 1930 – professional football player
Bill Overmyer 1971 – professional football player
Jeris Pendleton 2011 – professional football player
Adam Shaheen 2017 – professional football player
Mike Wright (attended one year) – professional football player

News 
Robin Meade 1991 – CNN news anchor, 1992 Miss Ohio
Walter Leckrone – American newspaper editor

Politics 
Abiy Ahmed – Prime minister of Ethiopia, received MBA through Ashland-Ethiopia partnership, the 2019 Nobel Peace Prize winner.
Jack Brandenburg – Michigan state senator
Dean DePiero – mayor of Parma, Ohio
William Harvey Gibson – Republican politician from Ohio
Marilyn John – American politician
You Huichen – Taiwanese legislator.

Racing 
Tim Richmond (attended one year) – NASCAR driver

References

External links

Ashland University Athletics website

 
Education in Ashland County, Ohio
Educational institutions established in 1878
Private universities and colleges in Ohio
Buildings and structures in Ashland County, Ohio
Christian universities and colleges
University
Universities and colleges accredited by the Higher Learning Commission